Rowdies may refer to:
 Hooligans, a term commonly applied to fans of sports teams who engage in unruly and destructive behaviour
 Tampa Bay Rowdies, a minor league association football club from the United States
 Tampa Bay Rowdies (1975–1993), a defunct association football club from the United States
 Rowdies Rugby Football Club, a rugby club in the Missouri Rugby Union founded in 1978